Zakhar Yuryevich Pashutin (born May 3, 1974, in Sochi, USSR) is a retired Russian professional basketball player and basketball coach. At a height of 1.96 m (6'5"), and a weight of 95 kg (210 lbs.), he played as a shooting guard. He was also a member of the senior Russian national team, from 1996 to 2008. He is assistant coach for Parma Basket of the VTB United League.

Professional career
Pashutin played professionally with the following clubs: Spartak St. Petersburg, Avtodor Saratov, Pınar Karşıyaka, ASVEL, CSKA Moscow, Ural Great Perm, and UNICS Kazan.

National team career
Pashutin was also a member of the senior Russian national basketball team. With Russia's senior team, he played at the following tournaments: the 1997 EuroBasket, the 1998 FIBA World Championship, the 1999 EuroBasket, the 2001 EuroBasket, the 2002 FIBA World Championship, the 2005 EuroBasket, the 2007 EuroBasket, and the 2008 Summer Olympic Games.

He won the bronze medal at the 1997 EuroBasket, the silver medal at the 1998 FIBA World Championship, and the gold medal at the 2007 EuroBasket.

Coaching career
After he retired from playing professional basketball, Pashutin became a basketball coach.

Personal life
Pashutin's older brother, Evgeniy, is also a former professional basketball player and a basketball coach.

External links
 Euroleague.net Profile
 FIBA Archive Profile
 Eurobasket.com Profile
 FIBA Europe Profile

1974 births
Living people
1998 FIBA World Championship players
2002 FIBA World Championship players
ASVEL Basket players
Basketball players at the 2000 Summer Olympics
Basketball players at the 2008 Summer Olympics
BC Avtodor Saratov players
BC Spartak Saint Petersburg players
BC Spartak Saint Petersburg coaches
BC UNICS players
FIBA EuroBasket-winning players
Karşıyaka basketball players
Olympic basketball players of Russia
PBC CSKA Moscow players
PBC Ural Great players
Sportspeople from Sochi
Russian basketball coaches
Russian men's basketball players
Shooting guards